Victoria S. Sigler (born 1951) is a judge of the Miami-Dade County Circuit Court.  She was the first openly gay circuit judge in Florida.

Early life and education
Sigler was born in Albuquerque, New Mexico in 1951.  When Sigler was seven years old, her family moved to the Sacramento suburb of Carmichael, California.  She attended Colorado State University, where she earned a Bachelor of Arts and a Master of Arts, both in political science.  Sigler then attended Nova University (now known as Nova Southeastern University) and earned her Juris Doctor degree in 1980.

Judicial service
On January 4, 1994 Judge Sigler became the first out County Court Judge, having successfully run for the position.  On January 26, 2000, Florida Governor Jeb Bush announced his appointment of Sigler to the Circuit Court in Miami-Dade County.

See also 
 List of LGBT jurists in the United States

References

1951 births
Living people
Politicians from Albuquerque, New Mexico
Colorado State University alumni
Nova Southeastern University alumni
American women judges
LGBT judges
Lesbians
Florida state court judges
People from Carmichael, California
LGBT people from New Mexico
21st-century American women
LGBT people from California